Petar Čurović is a volleyball player from Montenegro, currently playing for NIS Vojvodina Novi Sad.

References

Living people
1984 births
Montenegrin men's volleyball players